The Civil Rights Memorial is an American memorial in Montgomery, Alabama, created by Maya Lin.  The names of 41 people are inscribed on the granite fountain as martyrs who were killed in the civil rights movement. The memorial is sponsored by the Southern Poverty Law Center.

Design
The names included in the memorial belong to those who were killed between 1955 and 1968. Those dates were chosen because in 1956 the U.S. Supreme Court ruled that racial segregation in schools was unlawful and 1968 is the year of the assassination of Martin Luther King Jr. The monument was created by Maya Lin, who is best known for creating the Vietnam Veterans Memorial in Washington, D.C. The Civil Rights Memorial was dedicated in 1989.

The concept of Lin's design is based on the soothing and healing effect of water. It was inspired by a passage from King's  "I Have a Dream" speech "...we will not be satisfied "until justice rolls down like waters and righteousness like a mighty stream..."  The quotation in the passage, which is inscribed on the memorial, is a direct paraphrase of Amos 5:24, as translated in the American Standard Version of the Bible.  The memorial is a fountain in the form of an asymmetric inverted stone cone.  A film of water flows over the base of the cone, which contains the 41 names included. It is possible to touch the smooth film of water and to alter it temporarily, which quickly returns to smoothness. As such, the memorial represents the aspirations of the civil rights movement to end legal racial segregation.

Tours and location
The memorial is in downtown Montgomery, at 400 Washington Avenue, in an open plaza in front of the Civil Rights Memorial Center, which was the offices of the Southern Poverty Law Center until it moved across the street into a new building in 2001. The memorial may be visited freely 24 hours a day, 7 days a week.

The Civil Rights Memorial Center offers guided group tours, lasting approximately one hour. Tours are available by appointment, Monday to Saturday.

The memorial is only a few blocks from other historic sites, including the Dexter Avenue King Memorial Baptist Church, the Alabama State Capitol, the Alabama Department of Archives and History, the corners where Claudette Colvin and Rosa Parks boarded buses in 1955 on which they would later refuse to give up their seats, and the Rosa Parks Library and Museum.

Names included

"Civil Rights Martyrs"
The 41 names included in the Civil Rights Memorial are those of:

 Louis Allen
 Willie Brewster
 Benjamin Brown
 Johnnie Mae Chappell
 James Chaney
 Addie Mae Collins
 Vernon Dahmer
 Jonathan Daniels
 Henry Hezekiah Dee
 Roman Ducksworth Jr.
 Willie Edwards
 Medgar Evers
 Andrew Goodman
 Paul Guihard
 Samuel Hammond Jr.
 Jimmie Lee Jackson
 Wharlest Jackson
 Martin Luther King Jr.
 Bruce W. Klunder
 George W. Lee
 Herbert Lee
 Viola Liuzzo
 Denise McNair
 Delano Herman Middleton
 Charles Eddie Moore
 Oneal Moore
 William Lewis Moore
 Mack Charles Parker
 Lemuel Penn
 James Reeb
 John Earl Reese
 Carole Robertson
 Michael Schwerner
 Henry Ezekial Smith
 Lamar Smith
 Emmett Till
 Clarence Triggs
 Virgil Lamar Ware
 Cynthia Wesley
 Ben Chester White
 Sammy Younge Jr.

"The Forgotten" 
"The Forgotten" are 74 people who are identified in a display at the Civil Rights Memorial Center.  These names were not inscribed on the Memorial because there was insufficient information about their deaths at the time the Memorial was created.  However, it is thought that these people were killed as a result of racially motivated violence between 1952 and 1968.

 Andrew Lee Anderson
 Frank Andrews
 Isadore Banks
 Larry Bolden
 James Brazier
 Thomas Brewer
 Hilliard Brooks
 Charles Brown
 Jessie Brown
 Carrie Brumfield
 Eli Brumfield
 Silas (Ernest) Caston
 Clarence Cloninger
 Willie Countryman
 Vincent Dahmon
 Woodrow Wilson Daniels
 Joseph Hill Dumas
 Pheld Evans
 J. E. Evanston
 Mattie Greene
 Jasper Greenwood
 Jimmie Lee Griffith
 A. C. Hall
 Rogers Hamilton
 Collie Hampton
 Alphonso Harris
 Izell Henry
 Arthur James Hill
 Ernest Hunter
 Luther Jackson
 Ernest Jells
 Joe Franklin Jeter
 Marshall Johnson
 John Lee
 Willie Henry Lee
 Richard Lillard
 George Love
 Robert McNair
 Maybelle Mahone
 Sylvester Maxwell
 Clinton Melton
 James Andrew Miller
 Booker T. Mixon
 Nehemiah Montgomery
 Frank Morris
 James Earl Motley
 Sam O'Quinn
 Hubert Orsby
 Larry Payne
 C. H. Pickett
 Albert Pitts
 David Pitts
 Ernest McPharland
 Jimmy Powell
 William Roy Prather
 Johnny Queen
 Donald Rasberry
 Fred Robinson
 Johnny Robinson
 Willie Joe Sanford
 Marshall Scott Jr.
 Jessie James Shelby
 W. G. Singleton
 Ed Smith
 Eddie James Stewart
 Isaiah Taylor
 Freddie Lee Thomas
 Saleam Triggs
 Hubert Varner
 Clifton Walker
 James Waymers
 John Wesley Wilder
 Rodell Williamson
 Archie Wooden

See also
 Civil rights movement in popular culture
 History of fountains in the United States
 Title I of the Civil Rights Act of 1968

References

External links
 Official Site
 Civil Rights Martyrs

1989 establishments in Alabama
1989 sculptures
Buildings and structures in Montgomery, Alabama
Fountains in Alabama
History of civil rights in the United States
History of Montgomery, Alabama
Monuments and memorials in Alabama
Monuments and memorials of the civil rights movement
Southern Poverty Law Center
Tourist attractions in Montgomery, Alabama